España, la primera globalización (Spain, the first globalization) is a Spanish historical documentary film. It was directed by José Luis López-Linares and released in 2021.

Contents
The documentary focuses on little known aspects of the history of the Spanish Empire in order to debunk the Spanish Black Legend. It features the presence of 39 historians, such as John Elliott, María Ángeles Pérez Samper, Ricardo García Cárcel, Ramón Tamames, Nigel Townson, Carmen Iglesias, Elvira Roca Barea and Carlos Martínez Shaw. Next to historians, also geneticist Maarten Larmuseau and museum conservator Gijs van der Ham were interviewed.

People interviewed

 Ferran Adrià
 Ana María Carabias Torres
 Jaime Contreras
 Natalia Denisova
 Carlos Enrique Díaz Urbina
 John Elliott
 Catalina Font
 Antonio García Abasolo
 Rubén García Benito
 Ricardo García Cárcel
 Fernando García de Cortázar
 Manuel Gómez Lara
 Ignacio Gómez de Liaño
 Alfonso Guerra
 Marcelo Gullo
 Gijs van der Ham
 Abigail R. Horro
 Luo Huiling
 Carmen Iglesias
 Pedro Insúa
 Miguel Ángel Ladero Quesada
 Maarten Larmuseau
 Patricio Lons
 Carlos Adrián López Ramos
 Manuel Lucena Giraldo
 Carlos Martínez Shaw
 Juan José Morales
 José María Moreno Martín
 Stanley G. Payne
 María Ángeles Pérez Samper
 Alicia Relinque
 Juan Carlos Rey
 Luis Ribot
 Martín Ríos Saloma
 Elvira Roca Barea
 Adelaida Sagarra Gamazo
 Blas Sierra de la Calle
 Ramón Tamames
 Nigel Townson
 Ricardo Andrés Uribe Parra
 Enriqueta Vila Vilar

Production
The project had a budget of €210.000, of which €96.160 (46%) were raised through an Internet crowdfunding campaign.

Reception
España, la primera globalización became the most watched Spanish documentary in 2021, grossing €297.000 at the box office.

References

External links
 Official website
 Official trailer
 Twitter profile
 España, la primera globalización: El camino español, at RTVE Play.

2021 films
2020s Spanish-language films
Documentary films about Spain
Spanish documentary films
2021 documentary films